"Some Day" is a song, with music by Rudolf Friml and words by Brian Hooker, originally published in 1925. It was included in Friml's operetta The Vagabond King, sung by Carolyn Thomson in the role of Katherine de Vaucelles.

The song was sung by Jeanette MacDonald in the first musical film version of The Vagabond King, made in 1930, and by Kathryn Grayson in the 1956 remake. The song was recorded a number of times afterward, but the only version popular enough to chart in Billboard was recorded in 1954 by Frankie Laine. His recording was released by Columbia Records as catalog number 40235. It first reached the Billboard Best Seller chart on June 23, 1954 and lasted six weeks on the chart, peaking at number 18.

Recorded versions
Nancy Anderson
Mimi Benzell (1951)
Eddie Fisher (1966 LP, This Is Eddie Fisher)
Jean Fenn (1956)
Jackie Gleason Orchestra
Jerry Gray and his orchestra
Kathryn Grayson (Film Soundtrack, 1956)
Lois Hunt and Earl Wrightson (1951)
Frankie Laine (1954)
Mario Lanza and Judith Raskin (1956)
Sergio Franchi and Anna Moffo duet on 1963 RCA Victor Red Seal album The Dream Duet
Jeanette MacDonald (Film Soundtrack, 1930)
Tony Martin (1952)
Winnie Melville (London Production, 1927)
101 Strings
Rocco Scotti
Carolyn Thomson (Broadway Production, 1925)
Bob Wilber

References

1925 songs
Songs with music by Rudolf Friml
Frankie Laine songs